NSEP may refer to:
National Security Education Program
National Standard Examination in Physics
Norwegian EHR Research Centre